Steinunn Þórarinsdóttir (transliterated as Thorarinsdottir; born April 20, 1955) is an Icelandic sculptor. Her work uses androgynous human figures such as those in her most notable exhibits Borders and Horizons.

Biography 
Steinunn lives and works in Reykjavik, Iceland. She married Jon Arsæll and has two sons. Steinunn studied art in England at the University of Portsmouth Fine Art Department and in Bologna, Italy at the Accademia di Belle Arte. Her teachers included British sculptor Darrell Viner.

Steinunn is a member of the Reykjavik Association of Sculptors where she served as president from 1985 to 1987. In 2009 she was awarded the Order of the Falcon by the President of Iceland for her contribution to the Icelandic and international art communities.

Exhibits

Horizons 
This exhibit of 12 life-size androgynous figures has made appearances at the Georgia Museum of Art, Knoxville Museum of Art as well as locations in Alabama, New York, Tennessee, Texas, and Illinois beginning in 2007. The figures, each in a unique pose, are made of cast iron and are cohesive as a collection by the band of polished glass around their chests.

Steinunn explained the significance of her choice in materials: “The color of the iron signifies their primal quality—as if they are emerging from the earth” while “Glass as a material has a lot of different connotations. It can be fragile, yet dangerous. It can be translucent, or solid. . . It's like water, but also like air.”

The exhibit was showcased in the documentary Horizons: The Art of Steinunn Þórarinsdóttir directed by Frank Cantor and featuring music by Björk. The film, exploring the human condition through Steinunn's work, was awarded a Cine Golden Eagle, Special Jury and Masters Award from the International Cine Festival in Washington, D.C. in 2009.

Borders
This 26 piece exhibit was originally sculpted for exhibition in Dag Hammarskjöld Plaza outside the United Nations Headquarters in New York City in 2011. The androgynous figures are divided into 13 pairs which mirror each other. Each pair includes a cast iron and an aluminum figure. After their time in NYC, Borders traveled to Dallas, Seattle, Chicago, and was on display at Valparaiso University in Northwest Indiana from 2014-2016. Borders is currently displayed at Pyramid Hill Sculpture Park in Hamilton, Ohio. 

Steinunn posed her kneeling, standing, and sitting pairs in politically and socially charged areas purposefully The exhibit also calls back to Steinunn's family since she used her eighteen-year-old son as a model.

Brauer Museum of Art Director/Curator, Gregg Hertzlieb described the exhibit's social commentary on unity and diversity: "The figures observe invisible borders that keep them forever separated, and yet the similarities between the pairs, and among all the figures, acknowledge a shared nature that attracts and transfixes them. Viewers experiencing the silent dialogue between the paired iron and aluminum figures realize that, while difference may initially gain attention, what sustains this symbolic and eternal exchange is empathy and respect."

Encounters with Iceland
After a trip to Iceland in 2013, Mission Hill Family Estate winery proprietor Anthony von Mandl decided to bring an exhibit of Steinunn's work to the estate in Okanagan Valley, Canada. The exhibit includes more than 40 of Steinunn's life-size sculptures in cast iron and aluminum. Some are in mirrored pairs like those of Borders while others are single figures. The exhibit stayed at the winery June–December 2014.

Commissions

'Waves'
In 2010, Steinunn unveiled her sculpture 'Waves' commissioned by The University of Aberdeen, Scotland. The sculpture consists of two cast aluminum curved towers with one human figure at the base of one and another human figure on top of the other. The nine meter tall sculpture sits outside the Aberdeen Sports Village. Steinunn said, "The sculpture ‘Waves’ is inspired by the special character of Aberdeen with its open seas and unique colour as well as the shape of the Aberdeen Sports Village building. The work expresses dynamic movement, progress and a journey of discovery.”

'Voyages'
 'Voyages' is Steinunn's two part sculpture that was commissioned by the British and Icelandic governments. The sister statues gaze out over the waters between Hull, England and Vik, Iceland. The two fishing towns have a long history of trade relations spanning over 1000 years which was colored by the Cod War in the 1950s and 1970s. The statues symbolize the reestablishment of friendship between the two towns. Poets Angela Leighton, Carol Rumens, Cliff Forshaw, and David Wheatley composed poems in honor of the unveiling of the sculptures.

The statue in Hull was stolen in July 2011 presumably by scrap metal thieves. Insurance money was able to cover the cost of replacing the statue

Sculptures

References

1955 births
Living people
Icelandic sculptors